Dimitra Hadjivasili (born 27 February 1989) is a Cypriot former footballer. She has been a member of the Cyprus women's national team.

International goals
Scores and results list Cyprus' goal tally first

References

1989 births
Living people
Cypriot women's footballers
Cyprus women's international footballers
Twin sportspeople
Cypriot twins
Women's association footballers not categorized by position